Nakul Dubey is an Indian politician from the Indian National Congress and a former urban development minister in the Government of Uttar Pradesh when Mayawati was Chief Minister.

Before joining politics in 2007, Dubey was an advocate by profession, practising in Lucknow High Court. He was also elected as a member of the Bar Council of Uttar Pradesh in 2006, securing the maximum votes in the state.

Dubey quit his career as a lawyer in 2007 and contested the Uttar Pradesh Vidhan Sabha elections in the Mahona constituency as a BSP candidate. He was Minister of Urban Development, Environment and Prohibition during 2007–12.

In 2012, Dubey contested the Legislative Assembly elections in Bakshi Kaa Talab constituency, Lucknow district. He lost by a margin of few hundred votes.

Subsequently, in the 2014 Lok Sabha elections, Dubey stood as a candidate in Lucknow. Again, he did not win.

Dubey was given the Jawaharlal Nehru National Urban Renewal Mission Award for the best work in Kanpur.

In the year 2019, he contested Lok Sabha elections from Sitapur on BSP seat but lost to Rajesh Verma of BJP. 

In May 2022 he joined the Indian National Congress.

Positions held

Electoral Performance

References

Politicians from Lucknow
Uttar Pradesh MLAs 2007–2012
Bahujan Samaj Party politicians from Uttar Pradesh
Bahujan Samaj Party candidates in the 2014 Indian general election
Living people
Year of birth missing (living people)

 2. https://theprint.in/india/ex-bsp-minister-nakul-dubey-joins-congress/971705/

 3. https://www.amarujala.com/india-news/bsp-big-brahmin-face-nakul-dubey-joins-congress-party

 4. https://indianexpress.com/article/political-pulse/after-expulsion-dubey-thanks-mayawati-for-setting-me-free-7873931/

 5. https://www.amarujala.com/uttar-pradesh/azamgarh/congress-is-fighting-the-battle-of-farmers-students-and-unemployed-nakul-dubey-azamgarh-news-vns6799132162

 6. https://www.bhaskar.com/local/uttar-pradesh/azamgarh/news/azamgarh-congress-provincial-president-nakul-dubey-said-130459492.html